Get It Together is a British children's television series, produced by Granada Television for the UK ITV network between 6 April 1977 and 22 December 1981. The series followed an almost identical format to the earlier Lift Off with Ayshea, also created by series producer Muriel Young.

The series was presented by former 'straight man' to Basil Brush, Roy North, initially with Linda Fletcher and then later with Megg Nicol who had made her debut presenting with David Jensen in Yorkshire TV's Pop Quest. Whereas Lift Off had been originally designed to showcase viewer's pop music requests by guest artists, Get It Together relied more on the presenters and resident band and singers. Mike Moran was the show's musical director, leading the studio band on camera, with singers including Victy Silva and Kim Goody.

According to the BFI database, the first show was televised on 6 April 1977 and the last on 22 December 1981. It is possible that the first transmission was in fact earlier. One of the first guests on the series were that year's British representatives in the Eurovision Song Contest Lynsey de Paul & Mike Moran, but that episode is not listed in the BFI credits.

According to BFI, Series 1 ran from 6 April – 6 July 1977, consisting of 13 episodes. The show then returned later that year for a Christmas special on 27 December, entitled Get It Together with The Bay City Rollers.

Series 2 ran from 10 January – 21 March 1978, featuring 12 shows.

Series 3 ran from 19 September – 19 December 1978, followed by a Christmas Special on 26 December, for a total of 15 shows.

Series 4 ran from 10 April – 15 May 1979, for just 6 episodes.

Series 5 ran from 27 November 1979 – 6 March 1980, including the Get It Together Christmas Bonanza on 26 December 1979, for a run of 13 shows.

Series 6 ran from 23 September – 23 December 1980, featuring 14 shows, with Megg Nicol replacing Linda Fletcher as co-presenter to North.

The final series 7, ran from 1 September – 22 December 1981, featuring 17 shows. 

Guests that featured throughout the series run included: the Bay City Rollers, Squeeze, U2, Sally Oldfield, Chas & Dave, Showaddywaddy, Berni Flint, The Glitter Band, Billy Ocean, Shakin' Stevens, T.Rex, Sad Café, Mink DeVille, Steve Gibbons Band, Eddie and the Hot Rods, Strawbs, The Real Thing, Lynsey de Paul & Rocky Sharpe and the Replays, Slade and The Vapors.

References

External links

1977 British television series debuts
1981 British television series endings
1977 in British music
1970s British music television series
1980s British music television series
Pop music television series
British television shows featuring puppetry
British music chart television shows
British children's musical television series
ITV children's television shows
Television series by ITV Studios
Television shows produced by Granada Television
English-language television shows
1970s British children's television series
1980s British children's television series